Castelfondo is a comune (municipality) in Trentino in the northern Italian region Trentino-Alto Adige/Südtirol, located about  north of Trento.

Geography

Castelfondo borders the following municipalities: Brez, Fondo, St. Pankraz, Unsere Liebe Frau im Walde-St. Felix and Laurein.

Demographic evolution

References

Cities and towns in Trentino-Alto Adige/Südtirol
Nonsberg Group